Matthew Christopher Whiteside (born August 8, 1967 in Charleston, Missouri) is a former Major League Baseball pitcher. He graduated from Charleston High School in Charleston, lettering in baseball, football, and basketball, in 1986, and then attended Arkansas State, graduating with a degree in physical education. While at Arkansas, Whiteside joined Pi Kappa Alpha fraternity.

Standing at 6'2" and weighing 205 pounds, the right-hander was drafted by the Texas Rangers 661st overall, in the 25th round of the  draft. Whiteside spent nearly three successful seasons in the minors before making his Major League debut on August 5, at the age of 24. His first appearance came against the Oakland Athletics, pitching a perfect inning. In Whiteside's first season in the majors, he made 20 appearances, all in relief in relief, posting a 1.93 ERA and saving four games.

He started only one game in his major league career, on July 20, . Whiteside pitched four innings, giving up six hits and five earned runs and received a no-decision.

After 13 games in the majors in 2001 with the Atlanta Braves (who picked him up as a free agent), Whiteside bounced around in the minors and international baseball (Yokohama BayStars in Japan in ) until . After the latter showing, Whiteside was called up to the majors for a two-game stint with the Toronto Blue Jays. He struggled in that short time—in 3 innings, he gave up eight earned runs (six hits, three home runs, five walks, one hit batter) for an ERA of 19.64.

On July 15, 2005, Whiteside was suspended for 15 games for violating minor league baseball's steroid policy. He spent  with the Indianapolis Indians, posting a 1.69 ERA in 20 games, collecting 10 saves.

In 1996, he served as a guest judge at the Miss USA Pageant.

References

External links
, or Retrosheet, or Baseball Reference (Minor, Japanese and Winter leagues), or Pura Pelota (Venezuelan Winter League)

1967 births
Living people
American expatriate baseball players in Canada
American expatriate baseball players in Japan
American sportspeople in doping cases
Arkansas State Red Wolves baseball players
Atlanta Braves players
Baseball players from Missouri
Butte Copper Kings players
Colorado Springs Sky Sox players
Gastonia Rangers players
Indianapolis Indians players
Indios de Mayagüez players
Las Vegas Stars (baseball) players
Major League Baseball pitchers
Major League Baseball players suspended for drug offenses 
Naranjeros de Hermosillo players
American expatriate baseball players in Mexico
Oklahoma City 89ers players
People from Charleston, Missouri
Philadelphia Phillies players
Richmond Braves players
San Diego Padres players
Scranton/Wilkes-Barre Red Barons players
Syracuse SkyChiefs players
Texas Rangers players
Tiburones de La Guaira players
American expatriate baseball players in Venezuela
Toronto Blue Jays players
Tulsa Drillers players
Yokohama BayStars players